Saxifraga nathorstii, Nathorst's saxifrage, is a species of flowering plant belonging to the family Saxifragaceae. Saxifraga nathorstii is a putative allotetraploid hydrid between S. aizoides and S. oppositifolia, and morphologically intermediate, even in terms of pollen, between the parent species.

It is native and endemic to Greenland, and has a limited distribution in Northeast Greenland.

Description 
It is a somewhat densely tufted perennial with 3 – 6 cm high ascending stems. The singular sordid pink to fleshy coloured flowers are 8 – 15 mm wide, have 5 petals, which do not overlap, and 5 sepals 2 – 3 mm long.

Stems with alternate to opposite 4 – 9 mm long lance-shaped leaves with a pointed oval apex.

Distribution and habitat 
Commonly found on moist sandy to gravelly soils, e.g. in riverbeds sand and gravel or desiccated ponds.

Distribution ranges from Danmarks Island (70°30'N) to Jonsbu, Hochstetter Foreland (75°20'N).

Conservation status 
Despite is its limited distribution range and endemic status it is not a threatened species. The Greenland red list 2018 assesses the species to be of Least concern, but a species of national responsibility due to it endemic status. S. nathorstii have not been assessed on the IUCN red list.

References

nathorstii
Endemic flora of Greenland
Flora of Greenland